The 2010 Thai League Cup kicked off on 4 August 2010 with the Bangkok & field regional qualifiers. The Thai League Cup was readmitted back into Thai football after a 10-year absence. This edition was sponsored by Toyota thus naming it Toyota League Cup. The prize money for this prestigious award is said to be around 5 million baht and the runners-up will be netting 1 million baht.

The prize money was not the only benefit of this cup, the team winning the fair play spot wins a Hilux Vigo. The MVP of the competition got a Toyota Camry Hybrid Car. The winner of the cup earned the right to participate on a cup competition in Japan.

This was the first edition of the competition and the qualifying round was played in regions featuring clubs from the Regional League Division 2.

Calendar

Qualifying round

|colspan="3" style="background-color:#99CCCC"|4 August 2010

|-
|colspan="3" style="background-color:#99CCCC"|11 August 2010

|-
|colspan="3" style="background-color:#99CCCC"|18 August 2010

|-
|}
 1  Nonthaburi won 2-0 because Kasetsart University walked off the pitch during the middle of the game.
 2  Raj-Vithi withdrew.
 3Chumphon withdrew.

First round

|-
|}
 1  Songkhla withdrew after the first leg.

Second round

|-
|}

Third round

|-
|}

Quarter-final

|-
|}

Semi-final

|-
|}

Final

|colspan="3" style="background-color:#99CCCC"|21 November 2010

|-
|}

2010 in Thai football cups
Thailand League Cup
2010
2010